Christianity in Niger was brought with French colonial institutions, and its adherents include local believers from the educated, the elite, and colonial families, as well as immigrants from neighboring coastal countries, particularly Benin, Togo, and Ghana.

Demographics
Christians, both Roman Catholics and Protestants, account for less than one percent of the population—one estimate has Christians at 0.4% and Evangelicals at 0.1%—and are mainly present in the regions of Maradi and Dogondoutchi, and in Niamey and other urban centers with expatriate populations. Current estimates place the current Christian population at about 56,000 individuals with projected growth resulting in about 84,500 Christians by the year 2025.

Foreign Christian missionary organizations are active in the country, continuing a tradition dating back to the colonial period.  The first Catholic mission was founded in 1931, while the first Protestant missionaries came to Zinder in 1924 and to Tibiri a few years later.  In the late 1970s there were some 12,000 Catholic and 3,000 Protestant converts in Niger, with the remaining Christian population made up of foreigners. A 2015 study estimates some 4,500 believers in Christ came from a Muslim background residing in Niger.

Protest violence
In January 2015, churches and Christian-owned shops were targeted in protests over the publications of the Charlie Hebdo issue No. 1178 in France. The publication sparked riots in the Nigerien city of Zinder, Maradi and Gouré, which resulted in attacks on churches, Christian-owned shops and a French cultural center. Muslim crowds demonstrating against Muhammad's depiction attacked and set alight French businesses and churches with incendiary devices in Niamey. According to President Mahamadou Issoufou at least ten people were killed over two days of protests.

See also
Religion in Niger
Roman Catholicism in Niger

References